Barvinkove is a city in Izium Raion of Kharkiv Oblast of Ukraine. It hosts the administration of Barvinkove urban hromada, one of the communities of Ukraine. locally referred to as Barvinkove   Population:

History
Barvinkove was first mentioned in 1653.

Until 18 July 2020, Barvinkove was the administrative center of Barvinkove Raion. The raion was abolished in July 2020 as part of the administrative reform of Ukraine, which reduced the number of raions of Kharkiv Oblast to seven. The area of Barvinkove Raion was merged into Izium Raion.

Gallery

References

Cities in Kharkiv Oblast
Cities of district significance in Ukraine
Izyumsky Uyezd
Cities and towns built in the Sloboda Ukraine